Don't Tempt Me (also known as Sin noticias de Dios in Spanish and No News From God in English) is a 2001 Mexican and Spanish co-production comedy film. The screenplay for the film was written especially for Penélope Cruz and Victoria Abril by the award-winning Spanish writer and director Agustín Díaz Yanes of Nadie hablará de nosotras cuando hayamos muerto.

Plot
Lola, who works as a nightclub singer in Heaven, is sent by her boss Marina on a mission to Earth to save the soul of a Spanish boxer called Manny. His brain damaged in his last bout, with any blow liable to carry him off, he is deeply in debt and suicidal. Lola appears as his former wife, wanting to be with him again, and tries to get him to reconcile with his mother. Living with him and his mood swings is hard work however, he being a total chauvinist interested in little beyond boxing, food and sex.

Carmen, who works as a waitress in Hell, is sent by her boss Davenport to get Manny into the ring again. She appears as his cousin and takes the spare room in the flat. While Lola plays the meek housewife, Carmen is flashy and lesbian. During the day, both she and Lola take jobs in a hypermarket, where they sympathise with the downtrodden staff and despise the corrupt management.

Manny, as well as guilt over his breach with his mother, is regularly harassed by a couple of plain-clothes heavies sent by a corrupt police chief he owes money to. While the angelic Lola tries to buy time, the diabolic Carmen tells Manny that he could win the money by fighting again.

Hell is getting very full and there are serious divisions among the management. In an effort to save his position, Davenport makes a secret deal with Marina, who he admires greatly. His argument is that without Heaven there would be no Hell, and vice versa. People on Earth, he feels, should have a free choice. So in this one case he is happy to see Manny choose Heaven, which is getting dangerously empty, and tells Carmen to work with rather than against Lola.

The two women decide to rob the hypermarket and give the proceeds to Manny, who can pay off the cops with the stolen money and need never fight again. After lifting the day's takings from the cashier's office at gunpoint, they try to walk out through the crowded store, until two of the management start shooting. The women manage in the end to escape with the money, but on getting back to Manny's flat find the crooked police there with him. After he enables the two women to escape the trap, the cops beat him to death.

For that last sacrifice, after some debate he is allowed into Heaven. But Lola and Carmen are caught, and locked away in a Spanish prison. When released, Carmen gets promotion in Hell far above her waitress status and is granted her wish of becoming a man again.

Cast
Victoria Abril - Lola Nevado
Penélope Cruz - Carmen Ramos
Demián Bichir - Manny
Gemma Jones	- Nancy
Fanny Ardant - Marina D'Angelo
Juan Echanove - Supermarket manager
Gael García Bernal - Davenport
Emilio Gutiérrez Caba - Police chief
Cristina Marcos - Police officer
Luis Tosar - Police officer
Bruno Bichir - Eduardo
Elena Anaya - Pili
Peter McDonald - Henry
Elsa Pataky - Waitress in Hell

Awards
The film was nominated for the Goya Awards in 2002 in the categories of Best Picture, Best Actress (Victoria Abril) and Best Supporting Actor (Gael García Bernal).

Bichir won the "Best Bichir in a Movie" MTV Movie Awards-Mexico.

Trivia
Javier Bardem (Penélope Cruz's later real-life husband) makes an unbilled cameo appearance (without dialogue) at the very end of the film as Cruz's character's male form.

External links
 Review of MTV Awards-Mexico

2001 films
Mexican comedy films
Spanish comedy films
2000s Spanish-language films
2000s French-language films
Latin-language films
2001 comedy films
Films scored by Bernardo Bonezzi
Films directed by Agustín Díaz Yanes
2000s English-language films
2000s Spanish films
2000s Mexican films